Aminuis Constituency is an electoral constituency in the Omaheke Region of Namibia. It had 12,343 inhabitants in 2004 and 7,847 registered voters . The district capital is the settlement of Aminuis. The constituency forms part of the border between Namibia and Botswana.

Villages and settlements in the Aminuis constituency include:
 Leonardville
 Okombepera
 Onderombapa
 Ondjiripumua
 Okamuina
 Otjijere
 Okumu
 Ondjirimua
 Omitiomire
 Ozondjiva

The constituency also is the home of the traditional seat of the Ovaherero Paramount Chief, at the village of Toasis, situated south of Aminuis. In the Herero and Namaqua War of 1904–1907 the village was the location of the Battle of Toasis on 17 December 1905. Later Chief Hosea Kutako had his homestead there, and currently a community heroes' acre for Ovaherero and Ovambanderu is planned.

Politics
Aminuis is traditionally a stronghold of National Unity Democratic Organisation (NUDO). The 2015 regional election was won by its candidate Peter Kazongominja with 2,413 votes, followed by Utiriua Kavari of the SWAPO Party with 1,785 votes. Councillor Kazongominja (NUDO) was reelected in the 2020 regional election with 1,921 votes, followed by Ishmael Mungunda (SWAPO) with 1,482 votes and independent candidate Isando Kavari with 600 votes.

See also
 Administrative divisions of Namibia

References

Constituencies of Omaheke Region
States and territories established in 1992
1992 establishments in Namibia